Evanthia Makrygianni (born 30 August 1986) is a Greek former synchronized swimmer who competed in the 2008 Summer Olympics.

References

1986 births
Living people
Greek synchronized swimmers
Olympic synchronized swimmers of Greece
Synchronized swimmers at the 2008 Summer Olympics